Ian Davidson (born 8 September 1937) is a Scottish former footballer who played in the Football League for Darlington, Middlesbrough and Preston North End.

References

External links
 

1937 births
Living people
Footballers from East Lothian
Scottish footballers
Kilmarnock F.C. players
Preston North End F.C. players
Middlesbrough F.C. players
Darlington F.C. players
Durban United F.C. players
East London United F.C. players
Association football wing halves
Scottish Football League players
English Football League players
Scottish expatriate footballers
Expatriate soccer players in South Africa
Scottish expatriate sportspeople in South Africa